Rui Pedro Coimbra Chaves (born 11 September 1990), known as Ruca, is a Portuguese professional footballer who plays as a left-back for Académica de Coimbra.

Club career
Born in Tondela, Viseu District, Ruca moved to S.C. Beira-Mar's youth system at the age of 16 from local Clube de Futebol Repesenses. After winning the second-division juniors championship in 2009, he signed with Gil Vicente FC.

In his first season as a senior, Ruca was loaned to hometown's C.D. Tondela. He made his competitive debut against Amarante F.C. on 30 August 2009, in a match for the Taça de Portugal. He continued to be loaned the following years, to Vilaverdense FC, GD Oliveira de Frades (two spells) and again Tondela.

Ruca joined yet another club in the third division in the summer of 2013, SC Mirandela. He had been previously deployed as a left winger or attacking midfielder, but switched to left-back at his new team.

On 1 July 2014, Ruca signed for C.D. Mafra as a free agent after his contract with Gil expired. Starting in all his league appearances, he contributed seven goals to help the side win the championship and subsequently promote to the Segunda Liga.

Ruca agreed to a two-year deal with Vitória de Setúbal from the Primeira Liga, on 11 June 2015. He scored on his debut in the competition on 16 August, putting the hosts ahead 2–0 in an eventual 2–2 draw against Boavista FC.

On 30 August 2016, Ruca was linked to Cypriot club Apollon Limassol, but Vitória manager José Couceiro vetoed his departure due to lack of options in his position. On 30 December he left by mutual consent due to lack of playing time and, two days later, returned to Tondela.

Ruca continued to compete in the Portuguese second tier in the following seasons (a brief loan spell in the Cypriot First Division notwithstanding), representing Mafra, C.D. Feirense and F.C. Penafiel.

Club statistics

Honours
Vilaverdense
Braga Football Association: 2010–11

Mafra
Campeonato de Portugal: 2014–15

References

External links

1990 births
Sportspeople from Viseu District
Living people
Portuguese footballers
Association football defenders
Gil Vicente F.C. players
C.D. Tondela players
Vilaverdense F.C. players
SC Mirandela players
C.D. Mafra players
Vitória F.C. players
Alki Oroklini players
C.D. Feirense players
F.C. Penafiel players
PFC Beroe Stara Zagora players
Associação Académica de Coimbra – O.A.F. players
Campeonato de Portugal (league) players
Primeira Liga players
Cypriot First Division players
Liga Portugal 2 players
First Professional Football League (Bulgaria) players
Portuguese expatriate footballers
Expatriate footballers in Cyprus
Portuguese expatriate sportspeople in Cyprus
Expatriate footballers in Bulgaria
Portuguese expatriate sportspeople in Bulgaria